Norbert Brunner (born 21 June 1942) was the bishop of the Roman Catholic Diocese of Sion, Switzerland from 1995 to 2014. He was the elected President of the Swiss Bishops Conference for the term 2010–2012.

Biography
Brunner was born 1942 in Naters, Valais. He studied at the University of Innsbruck, Austria, and was ordained to the Catholic priesthood on 6 July 1968.

His resignation as Bishop of Sion was accepted, in accordance with Canon 401.2 of the 1983 Latin rite Code of Canon Law, by Pope Francis on Tuesday, 8 July 2014, and that same day, Pope Francis named the Right Reverend Abbot Jean-Marie Lovey, CRB, so far Provost (Superior General) of the Congregation of Canons Regular of St. Bernard the Great.

Views

In November 2009, he declared that he was in favor of the ordination of married priests, and that most Swiss Bishops agreed with him on this.

During a Synod, Bishop Brunner insisted that the measures taken at Vatican II to promote collegiality still had not found their objective. Once again, he said with preoccupation, what value do the pastoral needs of the local churches have for the Roman Curia?

Brunner wrote about the canonical situation of the Society of St. Pius X and concluded that the 1988 consecrations were valid but illicit, in the sense that Lefebvre did consecrate bishops but that these consecrations were against existing canonical norms.

External links
Diocèse de Sion 
Profile

References

Living people
1942 births
People from Naters
20th-century Roman Catholic bishops in Switzerland
21st-century Roman Catholic bishops in Switzerland
Roman Catholic Diocese of Sion